I Glykeria Tragoudai Antoni Vardi (Greek: Η Γλυκερία Τραγουδάει Αντώνη Βαρδή; English: Glykeria sings Antonis Vardis) is a studio album by Greek artist Glykeria released in 1996 by Sony Music Greece. It was her first release on her 10-year contract with the company. The whole album is composed by Antonis Vardis, a famous Greek singer-songwriter and composer.

Track listing 
 "Eklege Mazi" (Crying with...) – 4:26
 "Tha M'agapiseis" (Will you love me) – 3:29
 "Prin Mou Figeis Ksana" (Before you leave me again) – 3:48
 "Giname Kseni" (We've become strangers) – 4:53
 "Den Einai Mono" (That's not all) – 3:55
 "Kai Anigo To Parathiro" (And I open the window) – 4:12
 "Monahikes Ginaikes" (Lonely women) – 6:08
 "Me Hriso Vammeno Fridi" (With a golden dyed fringe) – 4:34
 "Na Xanartheis" (Come back) – 4:44
 "Stin Ellada Me Dalgkades" – 3:40
 "Ta Parathiria Tou Trellou" (The crazed's windows) – 4:12
 "Ego Eimai Ta Paraloga" – 3:15
 "Monahikes Ginaikes" (Lonely woman) (Instrumental) – 1:56

1996 albums
Glykeria albums
Greek-language albums
Sony Music Greece albums